Précieux-Sang is a community of the city of Bécancour, Quebec.

References

Neighbourhoods in Bécancour
Populated places disestablished in 1965